Alfred Whyman (born 1884) was an English footballer who played with Tottenham Hotspur, New Brompton and Queens Park Rangers.

References 
General

Specific

1884 births
Tottenham Hotspur F.C. players
Gillingham F.C. players
Queens Park Rangers F.C. players
English footballers
Footballers from Edmonton, London
Year of death missing
Association football midfielders